Tanja Tuulia Poutiainen (born 6 April 1980) is a retired World Cup alpine ski racer from Finland. She specialized in the technical events of slalom and giant slalom, and was the silver medalist in the women's giant slalom at the 2006 Winter Olympics in Torino.

Born in Rovaniemi, Lapland, Poutiainen started skiing at the age of three. She became junior world champion in slalom in 1997 at Schladming, Austria, and also took bronze in the super-G; she made her World Cup debut that March at Vail in the United States. At the 1999 Junior World Championships, she placed third in the giant slalom at Pra-Loup, France.

Poutiainen scored her first World Cup victory – and the first for a female Finnish alpine skier – on 28 February 2004 in a slalom held on home snow in Levi, Finland – the first alpine World Cup race to be held in the country. In the 2005 World Cup season, Poutiainen won the season titles in both the slalom and giant slalom, and placed fifth in the overall standings. Along the way she won three slaloms, a giant slalom and secured ten podium finishes. At the 2005 World Championships, she placed second in the giant slalom behind Anja Pärson of Sweden and second in the slalom behind Janica Kostelić of Croatia – the first alpine World Championship medals for a Finnish female.

The 2009 season saw Poutianen take another World Cup discipline title, in giant slalom, as well as bronzes in slalom and giant slalom at the World Championships in Val d'Isère.

Poutiainen was notable for her consistency, and between January 2007 and March 2011 she successfully completed every World Cup race she entered – a total of 67.

At the end of the 2014 season, Poutiainen had 11 World Cup victories, 48 podiums, and three World Cup discipline titles. She was trained by Michael Bont and lives in St. Gallen, Switzerland. She announced her retirement from the sport in March 2014.

World Cup results

Season titles

Season standings

Race victories
11 wins – (5 giant slalom, 6 slalom)

World Championship results

Olympic results

References

External links

 
 Tanja Poutianen World Cup standings at the International Ski Federation
 
 
 Fischer Skis – Tanja Poutiainen
 

1980 births
Finnish female alpine skiers
Alpine skiers at the 1998 Winter Olympics
Alpine skiers at the 2002 Winter Olympics
Alpine skiers at the 2006 Winter Olympics
Alpine skiers at the 2010 Winter Olympics
Alpine skiers at the 2014 Winter Olympics
Olympic alpine skiers of Finland
Medalists at the 2006 Winter Olympics
Olympic medalists in alpine skiing
Olympic silver medalists for Finland
FIS Alpine Ski World Cup champions
People from Rovaniemi
Sportspeople from St. Gallen (city)
Living people
Finnish expatriate sportspeople in Switzerland
Sportspeople from Lapland (Finland)